Louis Khoury (born 8 October 2000), is an Australian professional soccer player who plays as a midfielder for Sutherland Sharks.

Club career
Khoury joined Manchester City in 2011, at the age of 10 years old, signing a 6-year youth deal with the club.

References

External links

2000 births
Living people
Australian soccer players
Association football midfielders
Manchester City F.C. players
Blackburn Rovers F.C. players
Curzon Ashton F.C. players
Central Coast Mariners FC players
A-League Men players